Wannawat Ampunsuwan (born 15 July 1993) is a Thai badminton player.

Achievements

BWF International Challenge/Series 
Men's doubles

Mixed doubles

  BWF International Challenge tournament
  BWF International Series tournament
  BWF Future Series tournament

References

External links 
 

Living people
1993 births
Wannawat Ampunsuwan
Badminton players at the 2014 Asian Games
Wannawat Ampunsuwan
Competitors at the 2013 Southeast Asian Games
Competitors at the 2015 Southeast Asian Games
Wannawat Ampunsuwan
Southeast Asian Games medalists in badminton
Wannawat Ampunsuwan
Universiade medalists in badminton
Medalists at the 2017 Summer Universiade
Wannawat Ampunsuwan